Hyde County is a county located in the U.S. state of North Carolina. As of the 2020 census, the population was 4,589, making it the second-least populous county in North Carolina. Its county seat is Swan Quarter. The county was created in 1705 as Wickham Precinct. It was renamed Hyde Precinct in 1712 and gained county status in 1739.

History
The county was formed December 3, 1705, as Wickham Precinct, one of three precincts within Bath County.  The name "Wickham" was derived from the manor of "Temple Wycombe" in Buckinghamshire, England, the family home of John Archdale, Governor of North and South Carolina from 1695 to 1696.  In 1712 it was renamed Hyde Precinct, for Edward Hyde, Governor of North Carolina from 1711 to 1712.  In 1739 Bath County was abolished, and Hyde Precinct became Hyde County.

Various boundary changes have since taken place. In 1745 Lake Mattamuskeet and its adjoining territory were transferred from Currituck County to Hyde County. In 1819 the portion of Hyde County west of the Pungo River was annexed by Beaufort County. Four years later, the area of Currituck County south of New Inlet was transferred to Hyde County. This is now included Hatteras Island. In 1845 Ocracoke Island was transferred from Carteret County to Hyde County. In 1870 Hyde County was reduced to its present dimensions, when its northeastern part was combined with parts of Currituck County and Tyrrell County to form Dare County.  Since its creation, the boundaries of Hyde County have changed more than those of any other county in North Carolina.

Geography

It is the second-largest county in North Carolina by total area. Hyde County's in-land is part of the Inner Banks. Ocracoke Island is part of the Outer Banks.

Hyde County is one of the most rural counties in North Carolina, owing this to its low population, absence of four-lane highways, and even the absence of stoplights in the county.

National protected areas
 Alligator River National Wildlife Refuge (part)
 Cape Hatteras National Seashore (part)
 Mattamuskeet National Wildlife Refuge
 Pocosin Lakes National Wildlife Refuge (part)
 Swanquarter National Wildlife Refuge

State and locale protected areas 
 Dare Game Land (part)
 Emily and Richardson Preyer Buckridge Reserve (part)
 Gull Rock Game Land
 Hatteras Inlet Crab Spawning Sanctuary (part)
 New Lake Game Land (part)

Major water bodies 
 Alligator Lake
 Alligator River
 Atlantic Ocean
 Hatteras Inlet
 Intracoastal Waterway
 Lake Mattamuskeet
 Ocracoke Inlet
 Pamlico River
 Pamlico Sound
 Pungo Lake
 Pungo River
 Raleigh Bay

Adjacent counties
 Tyrrell County - north
 Dare County - northeast
 Carteret County - southwest
 Pamlico County - south
 Beaufort County - west
 Washington County - northwest

Major highways

Major infrastructure 
 Cedar Island - Ocracoke Ferry (To Carteret County)
 Hatteras - Ocracoke Ferry (To Dare County)
 Swan Quarter - Ocracoke Ferry

Demographics

2020 census

As of the 2020 United States census, there were 4,589 people, 1,947 households, and 1,378 families residing in the county.

2000 census
As of the census of 2000, there were 5,826 people, 2,185 households, and 1,433 families residing in the county.  The population density was 10 people per square mile (4/km2).  There were 3,302 housing units at an average density of 5 per square mile (2/km2).  The racial makeup of the county was 62.65% White, 35.07% Black or African American, 0.31% Native American, 0.36% Asian, 0.84% from other races, and 0.77% from two or more races.  2.25% of the population were Hispanic or Latino of any race.

There were 2,185 households, out of which 26.40% had children under the age of 18 living with them, 48.70% were married couples living together, 13.10% had a female householder with no husband present, and 34.40% were non-families. 30.60% of all households were made up of individuals, and 13.90% had someone living alone who was 65 years of age or older.  The average household size was 2.36 and the average family size was 2.94.

In the county, the population was spread out, with 20.40% under the age of 18, 7.90% from 18 to 24, 30.70% from 25 to 44, 24.60% from 45 to 64, and 16.40% who were 65 years of age or older.  The median age was 40 years. For every 100 females there were 112.20 males.  For every 100 females age 18 and over, there were 115.60 males.

The median income for a household in the county was $28,444, and the median income for a family was $35,558. Males had a median income of $25,216 versus $20,482 for females. The per capita income for the county was $13,164.  About 10.30% of families and 15.40% of the population were below the poverty line, including 19.50% of those under age 18 and 23.00% of those age 65 or over.

Law and government
Hyde County is a member of the Albemarle Commission regional council of governments.

Hyde County is served by six volunteer fire departments: Engelhard, Fairfield, Ocracoke, Scranton, Ponzer, and Swan Quarter.

Politics
Hyde County is located within North Carolina's 3rd congressional district. In the 2008 Presidential election, the county was narrowly divided, much like the rest of the state of North Carolina, with Barack Obama winning 1,241 votes, John McCain winning 1,212 votes, and other candidates winning 16 votes. The mainland area of the county tends to be dominated by Republicans, while Ocracoke tends to be dominated by Democrats.

Earl Pugh is chairman of the Hyde County Commissioners.

Education
Hyde County is home to the smallest public school system in North Carolina.  The Hyde County Schools comprises two schools. 
 Mattamuskeet School, K-12 serves the mainland
 Ocracoke School, K-12 serves Ocracoke Island

The only private school in Hyde County is a small Mennonite school located in the northwest section of the county.  This school serves the county's Mennonite population.

Culture 
Hyde County is a popular destination for fishing and bear and duck hunting. Ocracoke attracts many tourists.

Media 
Hyde County is home to two full power radio stations, WKHC 97.1 FM and WCMS-FM 94.5. These stations are licensed to Hatteras, NC but maintain transmitter facilities outside of Engelhard.

Ocracoke Island is home to WOVV 90.1 FM, a low power non-commercial station.

WHYC 88.5 FM is located on the campus of Mattamuskeet School in Swan Quarter.  WHYC is one of only two high school operated stations in North Carolina.

Communities

Hyde County has no incorporated municipalities.

Census-designated places
 Engelhard
 Fairfield
 Ocracoke (largest community)
 Swan Quarter (county seat)

Unincorporated communities
 Germantown
 Last Chance
 Nebraska
 Scranton
 Ponzer
 Sladesville

Townships
 Currituck
 Fairfield
 Lake Landing
 Ocracoke
 Swan Quarter

A sixth township, Mattamuskeet, is now "unorganized territory" occupied by the federally controlled Mattamuskeet National Wildlife Refuge.

See also
 List of counties in North Carolina
 National Register of Historic Places listings in Hyde County, North Carolina
 North Carolina Ferry System
 Blackbeard was killed after a battle on his ship the Queen Anne's Revenge near Ocracoke.
 National Park Service

References

External links

 
 

 
1739 establishments in North Carolina
Populated places established in 1739